is a Japanese actor represented by Stardust Promotion. In 2019, Hirose announced marriage with the actress, singer, and former AKB48 Team A member Rina Kawaei and that they were already expecting a baby.
In 2023, Hirose and Kawaei are expecting their second child.

Filmography

Drama
 The Memorandum of Kyoko Okitegami (2015) - Employee of Drink Kitchen (Ep. 9)
 Dansui! (2017) - Ryoya Kawasaki
 Majimuri Gakuen (2018) - Crazy Dog Jack / Shinichi Inuyama
 Masked Reunion (2019) - Kataoka Yamato
 Short Program (2022) - Kakimoto (Ep. 9)
 Avataro Sentai Donbrothers (2022) - Sonoshi

Movies
 Dancing Great Investigation Line THE MOVIE 3 Release them! (2010)
 Gachi-Ban: Worst Max (2012) - Ryota Hano
 Gachi-Ban: Tribal (2012)
 Seven Days: Monday - Thursday (2015) - Seryo Toji
 Seven Days: Friday - Sunday (2015) - Seryo Toji
 Counting sheep (2015) - Hiroyuki Marui
 Shake the scales (2016)
 The escaped fish is swimming (2017)
 Shukatsu (2015)
 The detective has a gloomy dream tonight (2017) - Reiji Benii
 The detective has a gloomy dream tonight 2 (2019)
 Goddess (2017) - Kawasaki Takumi
 High & Low The Movie 2 - End of Sky (2017) - Marco
 High & Low The Movie 3 - Final Mission (2017)
 DTC Yukemuri Junjo hen From High & Low (2018)
 The Universe at My Toe Tips (2017) - Yu, the manager
 Touken Ranbu (2019) - Uguisumaru
 Kizoku Korin: Prince of Legend (2020) - Yasu Michelle
 Kanuma (2019)
 Shanao - Edo Candy 3 - Yoritomo
 Hero (2020) - Hiroki Iizuka

Stage Play
 Peony flower (2009)
 EBiDAN(Ebisu Academy Boys' Club)
 The culture festival of EBiDAN...well it's not really a festival version (2010)
 Arashi no Seaside School !! Waves, Fights, Ebidans are Super Atukirin Patterns!! version (2011)
 GO-SUNS "Pistol" (2010)
 Theater Company "TAIYO MAGIC FILM" - "Hero" (2012) - Matsushima Ryuji
 Gokujo Bungaku "Night on the Galactic Railroad" (2012) - Giovanni
 High School Opera Company☆ Boys Group (2012) - Okajima Tetsuya
 Martini! Press right now for a 5 hours recording (2013) - Imamura Hayato
 Reading play "Tails' friends 2"
 Koyuki, Koharu and Kotaro (2013) - Kotaro
 A dog searching for a marriage partner (2013) - Goemon / Lupine
 Theater Company "TAIYO MAGIC FILM" - "Akane no Ma" (2013) - Takahama Yusuke
 Stage play "Yowamushi Pedal" - Makishima Yusuke
 Inter High Chapter: The First Result (2013)
 Inter High Chapter: The Second Order (2014)
 Inter High Chapter: The WINNER (2015)
 IRREGULAR ~ Two Summits (2015)
 Stage play "My Host-chan" - Yuki Ojo
 "My Host-chan" (2013)
 "My Host-chan" - Blood Fight! Fukuoka Nakasu edition (2014)
 "My Host-chan" - Clash! Sakae edition (2016)
 Reading play "Tails' friends 3"
 Dog graduation (2013) - Rocket
 August adventure (2013) - Haruo
 Our tomorrow (2014) - Shinpei Goto
 Tumbling FINAL (2014) - Kaneko Ryota
 Reading play "My plan of marrying a rich man" (2014) - Gerve
 Reading play "The eraser in my head" - Kosuke
 7th letter (2015)
 8th letter (2016)
 Takiguchi flame (2015) - Tomonori Yagyu
 Stage play "Ace of Diamond" - Satoru Furuya
 "Ace of Diamond The LIVE" (2015)
 "Ace of Diamond The LIVE II" (2016)
 "Ace of Diamond The LIVE III" (2016)
 "Ace of Diamond The LIVE V" (2017)
 Reading play "Tails' friends 4"
 Rokujo Ichima Kingdom (2015) - Ryunosuke
 Dog collage (2015) - Ryunosuke
 "New Year's Meijiza Offering Festival" Part 2 "Mononoke Show" (2015) - Guest appearance
 WORLD - beyond the destiny -(2016) - Ryuji
 Scarlet Pimpanell (2016) - Haru
 Dansui! (2017) - Kawasaki Ryoya
 Seven Souls in the Skull Castle - Season Moon (2017-2018) - Mukaiya Ranbei/ Mori Ranmaru
 Susanoo and Mikoto ~ Kojiki ~ (2018) - Susanoo
 A phonecall from my boyfriend (2018) - Fujiwara Hayao
 Recitated stage "Tomorrow I will date with yesterday's you" (2018) - Takatoshi Minamiyama
 "HERO" - Summer 2019 - (2019) - Iizura Hiroki
 The Count of Monte Christo - Kuroki Shougun to Catherine (2020) - Prosecutor Gérard de Villefort

References

External links
Tomose Hiroki's Stardust Profile
Tomoki Hirose's Ameba Blog "My Rule"
廣瀬智紀 (hirose_tomoki.0214) on Instagram

1980 births
Living people
People from Saitama Prefecture
Actors from Saitama Prefecture